Josef Illík (10 September 1919 – 21 January 2006) was a Czech cinematographer and photographer.

Life
Josef Illík studied photography in high school. His teachers were Ladislav Sutnar, Jaromír Funke and Josef Ehm. After the World War II he was a successful photographer, but also started working at Barrandov Studios as an assistant cinematographer. From 1952 to 1957 he was a cinematographer for army documentaries in Czechoslovak Army Film. Since 1958 he worked on feature films as a cinematographer. He frequently worked with directors Karel Kachyňa, Václav Krška and Václav Vorlíček.

Selected filmography
 Smugglers of Death (1959)
 Smugglers of Death (1959)
 The Slinger (1960)
 Spanilá jízda (1963)
 The House in Karp Lane (1965)
 Coach to Vienna (1966)
 The Nun's Night (1967)
 Jarní vody (1968)
 Witchhammer (1970)
 The Ear (1970)
 Three Nuts for Cinderella (1973)

Publications
 Josef Illík. Praha zasněná. Orbis, Prague 1959
 Josef Illík. Praha 1945 - 1958. Argo, Prague 2018

References

External links

1919 births
2006 deaths
Czech cinematographers
Photographers from Prague
Czechoslovak artists